Batu Kawan is a federal constituency in South Seberang Perai District and Central Seberang Perai District, Penang, Malaysia, that has been represented in the Dewan Rakyat since 2004.

The federal constituency was created in the 2003 redistribution and is mandated to return a single member to the Dewan Rakyat under the first past the post voting system.

Demographics 
https://live.chinapress.com.my/ge15/parliament/PENANG

History

Polling districts
According to the federal gazette issued on 31 October 2022, the Batu Kawan constituency is divided into 24 polling districts.

Representation history

State constituency

Current state assembly members

Local governments

Election results

References

2003 establishments in Malaysia
Penang federal constituencies